The 2022 Men's EuroHockey Indoor Championship II was the thirteenth edition of the Men's EuroHockey Indoor Championship II, the second level of the men's European indoor hockey championships organized by the European Hockey Federation. It took place from 14 to 16 January 2022 at the Pavilhão Rota dos Móveis in Paredes, Portugal.

Spain won their first Men's EuroHockey Indoor Championship II title by finishing top of the round-robin pool and were promoted to the Men's EuroHockey Indoor Championship in 2024 together with Poland, Croatia and Ukraine.

Qualified teams
Participating nations have qualified based on their final ranking from the 2020 competition.

Umpires
The following 10 umpires were chosen for the tournament.

Standings

Results
''All times are local (UTC+0).

Goalscorers

See also
2022 Men's EuroHockey Indoor Championship
2022 Men's EuroHockey Indoor Championship III
2022 Women's EuroHockey Indoor Championship II

References

Men's EuroHockey Indoor Championship II
Men 2
International field hockey competitions hosted by Portugal
EuroHockey Indoor Championship II
EuroHockey Indoor Championship II
Paredes, Portugal